Starting December 3, 2021, all visitors to Burundi, unless they come from one of the visa-exempt countries mentioned below, can obtain a visa upon arrival at Bujumbura International Airport (Melchior Ndadaye) and all land borders. They can also obtain from one of the Burundian diplomatic missions before entering the country.

Visa policy map

Visa exemption 

Citizens of the following 6 countries can visit Burundi without a visa for up to 3 months:

1 – Also for Economic Community of the Great Lakes Countries laissez-passer holders.

Holders of diplomatic passports of Turkey and diplomatic and service category passports of Brazil, China and Russia do not require a visa. Holders of passports for public affairs of China do not require a visa.

 

A visa waiver memorandum was signed with the United Arab Emirates in January 2019 but it is not yet in force.

Visa on arrival 
Passengers of all countries requiring a visa for Burundi can now request it upon arrival at Bujumbura International Airport (Melchior Ndadaye) and all land borders for a maximum stay of 1 month.

Transit 
Passengers with a confirmed onward ticket for a flight to a third country. They must stay in the international transit area of the airport and have documents required for the next destination.

See also

 Visa requirements for Burundian citizens

References 

Burundi
Foreign relations of Burundi